Scord's Wood and Brockhoult Mount is a  biological Site of Special Scientific Interest west of Sevenoaks in Kent. Scord's Wood is a Nature Conservation Review site, Grade I.

This sloping site has the best sessile oak stands in the county. Grasslands on acidic soils are mainly common bent, heath bedstraw, and sheep’s sorrel, together with some heather and bracken.

This site is composed of a number of scattered blocks, as well as public footpaths and bridleways that go through some areas.

References

Sites of Special Scientific Interest in Kent
Nature Conservation Review sites